William Troy Dungan Jr. (born November 17, 1936), better known as Troy Dungan, was the former chief weather anchor at WFAA-TV in Dallas, Texas for 30 years.

Dungan graduated from Baylor University, where he earned a Bachelor's degree. He received private meteorological training from the National Engineering Science Company in Houston while employed at KTRK-TV.

Dungan began his career at KWTX-TV in Waco, Texas in 1958. At WCAU he was the first weatherman to use the current 5-day forecast system. Before 1976, weather predictions were typically for a maximum of two days ahead.

Since July 19, 2006, the day of Dungan's 30th anniversary with WFAA-TV, he presented the weather only during News 8 at Six, with Pete Delkus taking over his duties at News 8 at Five and The News 8 Update (10 p.m.). This was to facilitate the transition from Dungan to Delkus as chief meteorologist/weather anchor for WFAA-TV.

In 2014, he became a spokesperson for 50 Floor with the jingle: "Call 877 50-FLOOR. Pick up the phone, we'll be knocking at your door!"

Awards
Since then he has been named the Best Television Weathercaster by the Texas Associated Press Broadcasters Association eight times. The Dallas Observer has named Dungan the Best Television Weathercaster five times. Dungan has also received the Knight of the Press Award, and special recognition from the National Oceanic Atmospheric Association Research Flight Facility for his work on a documentary film dealing with the subject of hurricanes. The Dallas Press Club has also bestowed the Katie Award onto him. During his last week as chief weather anchor, the National Weather Service gave Dungan an award for his service to the weather community.

Personal
Known for his trademark bow ties, Troy doesn't wear one on Thanksgiving. For reasons that are unknown, it is the only day of the year when he never wears a bow tie.

He started wearing bow ties in 1974 on WXYZ-TV after an ice-fishing story on Pontiac Lake.

Dungan is currently the spokesman for 'Santa's Helpers', which provides thousands of toys to needy children throughout Dallas and Fort Worth, Texas.

Dungan and wife Janet have three children; Leah, Dana, and Wyn-Erin.

References

Living people
1936 births
Baylor University alumni
People from Dallas
American television meteorologists
People from Hillsboro, Texas